The Gaussian integral, also known as the Euler–Poisson integral, is the integral of the Gaussian function  over the entire real line. Named after the German mathematician Carl Friedrich Gauss, the integral is

Abraham de Moivre originally discovered this type of integral in 1733, while Gauss published the precise integral in 1809. The integral has a wide range of applications.  For example, with a slight change of variables it is used to compute the normalizing constant of the normal distribution.  The same integral with finite limits is closely related to both the error function and the cumulative distribution function of the normal distribution. In physics this type of integral appears frequently, for example, in quantum mechanics, to find the probability density of the ground state of the harmonic oscillator. This integral is also used in the path integral formulation, to find the propagator of the harmonic oscillator, and in statistical mechanics, to find its partition function.

Although no elementary function exists for the error function, as can be proven by the Risch algorithm, the Gaussian integral can be solved analytically through the methods of multivariable calculus. That is, there is no elementary indefinite integral for

but the definite integral

can be evaluated. The definite integral of an arbitrary Gaussian function is

Computation

By polar coordinates
A standard way to compute the Gaussian integral, the idea of which goes back to Poisson, is to make use of the property that:

Consider the function on the plane , and compute its integral two ways:
 on the one hand, by double integration in the Cartesian coordinate system, its integral is a square: 
 on the other hand, by shell integration (a case of double integration in polar coordinates), its integral is computed to be 

Comparing these two computations yields the integral, though one should take care about the improper integrals involved.

Combining these yields

so

Complete proof
To justify the improper double integrals and equating the two expressions, we begin with an approximating function:

If the integral

were absolutely convergent we would have that its Cauchy principal value, that is, the limit

would coincide with

To see that this is the case, consider that

So we can compute

by just taking the limit

Taking the square of  yields

Using Fubini's theorem, the above double integral can be seen as an area integral

taken over a square with vertices  on the xy-plane.

The integrals over the two disks can easily be computed by switching from Cartesian coordinates to polar coordinates:

(See to polar coordinates from Cartesian coordinates for help with polar transformation.)

Integrating,

By the squeeze theorem, this gives the Gaussian integral

By Cartesian coordinates
A different technique, which goes back to Laplace (1812), is the following. Let

That is,

Thus, over the range of integration, and the variables  and  have the same limits. This yields:

Then, using Fubini's theorem to switch the order of integration:

Therefore, as expected.

By Laplace's method 

In Laplace approximation, we deal only with up to second-order terms in Taylor expansion, so we consider .  

In fact, since  for all , we have the exact bounds:Then we can do the bound at Laplace approximation limit:  

That is,  

By trigonometric substitution, we exactly compute those two bounds:  and   

By taking the square root of the Wallis formula, we have , the desired upper bound limit. Similarly we can get the desired lower bound limit.
Conversely, if we first compute the integral with one of the other methods above, we would obtain a proof of the Wallis formula.

Relation to the gamma function

The integrand is an even function,

Thus, after the change of variable , this turns into the Euler integral

where  is the gamma function. More generally,

which can be obtained by substituting  in the integrand of the gamma function  to get .

Generalizations

The integral of a Gaussian function

The integral of an arbitrary Gaussian function is

An alternative form is

This form is useful for calculating expectations of some continuous probability distributions related to the normal distribution, such as the log-normal distribution, for example.

n-dimensional and functional generalization

Suppose A is a symmetric positive-definite (hence invertible)  precision matrix, which is the matrix inverse of the covariance matrix. Then,

where the integral is understood to be over Rn.  This fact is applied in the study of the multivariate normal distribution.

Also,

Alternatively,

for some analytic function f, provided it satisfies some appropriate bounds on its growth and some other technical criteria. (It works for some functions and fails for others. Polynomials are fine.) The exponential over a differential operator is understood as a power series.

While functional integrals have no rigorous definition (or even a nonrigorous computational one in most cases), we can define a Gaussian functional integral in analogy to the finite-dimensional case.  There is still the problem, though, that  is infinite and also, the functional determinant would also be infinite in general. This can be taken care of if we only consider ratios:

 

In the DeWitt notation, the equation looks identical to the finite-dimensional case.

n-dimensional with linear term
If A is again a symmetric positive-definite matrix, then (assuming all are column vectors)

Integrals of similar form

where  is a positive integer and  denotes the double factorial.

An easy way to derive these is by differentiating under the integral sign.

One could also integrate by parts and find a recurrence relation to solve this.

Higher-order polynomials

Applying a linear change of basis shows that the integral of the exponential of a homogeneous polynomial in n variables may depend only on SL(n)-invariants of the polynomial. One such invariant is the discriminant,
zeros of which mark the singularities of the integral. However, the integral may also depend on other invariants.

Exponentials of other even polynomials can numerically be solved using series. These may be interpreted as formal calculations when there is no convergence. For example, the solution to the integral of the exponential of a quartic polynomial is

These integrals turn up in subjects such as quantum field theory.

See also

 List of integrals of Gaussian functions
 Common integrals in quantum field theory
 Normal distribution
 List of integrals of exponential functions
 Error function
 Berezin integral

References

Citations

Sources 

 
 
 

Integrals
Articles containing proofs
Gaussian function
Theorems in analysis